The following is a list of the 611 communes in the French department of Marne.

The communes cooperate in the following intercommunalities (as of 2020):
CU Grand Reims
Communauté d'agglomération de Châlons-en-Champagne
Communauté d'agglomération Épernay, Coteaux et Plaine de Champagne
Communauté d'agglomération de Saint-Dizier Der et Blaise (partly)
Communauté de communes de l'Argonne Champenoise
Communauté de communes de la Brie Champenoise
Communauté de communes Côtes de Champagne et Val de Saulx
Communauté de communes de la Grande Vallée de la Marne
Communauté de communes de la Moivre à la Coole
Communauté de communes des Paysages de la Champagne
Communauté de communes Perthois-Bocage et Der
Communauté de communes de la Région de Suippes
Communauté de communes de Sézanne-Sud Ouest Marnais
Communauté de communes du Sud Marnais
Communauté de communes Vitry, Champagne et Der

References

Marne